The Tangkhul people, also known as the Tangkhul Naga, are a Tibeto-Burmese ethnic group living in the Indo–Mayanmar border area, occupying the Ukhrul district and Kamjong district in the Northeast Indian state of Manipur, and in parts of neighboring Myanmar. Despite this international border, many Tangkhul have continued to regard themselves as "one nation". The name "Tangkhul" is originated from the Meitei language words, "Tang" meaning "scarce" and "Khul" meaning "village" respectively. According to another theory of origin, the term "Tangkhul" is derived from "Thankhul", meaning "Than village" in Meitei language.

Relationship with the Meiteis 

Haoreima, the Meitei goddess of tragic love and separation, was actually a deified person of the Tangkhul origin. She was a daughter of Khelemba, a Tangkhul chief of Chingdai village, and was married to Khamlangba, a Tangkhul chief of Chingshong village. Despite getting married to Khamlangba, she secretly had a love affair with Meitei king Meidingu Tabungba, also called Tabung Saphaba (1359-1394). Upon discovering the secret relationship between the two, Khamlangba, getting furious, beheaded Tabung Saphaba. Shocked by the tragic death of her lover, Haoreima took away her lover's head to the Kanglei Pungmayol. Later, she also died, following her lover's path and was eventually venerated as the Meitei goddess of tragic love and separation.
She is also identified as goddess Ireima, who's also an incarnation of goddess Panthoibi of the Meitei pantheon.

See also
 Bible translations into the languages of Northeast India

Further reading
 Akhui, Z. A. S. (1973) A Short Account of Tangkhul Naga Culture Imphal
 Arokianathan, S. (1987) Tangkhul Naga Grammar Central Institute of Indian Languages, Mysore, India, 
 Horam, Mashangthei (1988) Naga Insurgency: The Last Thirty Years Cosmo Publications, New Delhi, 
 Shimray, A. S. W. (2001) History of the Tangkhul Nagas Akansha Pub. House, New Delhi, 
 Shongzan, Mayaso (2013) "A Portrait of the Tangkhul Nagas" the Exodus, Ukhrul.
 Josiah Luithui, (2014) "Liberation Theology of the Head-Hunters Tangkhul Naga", TTA, Ukhrul.

Notable people 
Rishang Keishing
Darlando Khathing
Ralengnao Khathing
Rewben Mashangva
Wungngayam Muirang
Thuingaleng Muivah
Min Naing
Hormipam Ruivah
W. A. Shishak
Hangmila Shaiza
Yangmaso Shaiza
Rungsung Suisa
Ringyuichon Vashum

Notes

References

External links 
http://www.tangkhul.com
http://www.ukhrul.nic.in
http://www.tangkhulnet.tripod.com
https://tangkhulonline.com/

Scheduled Tribes of Manipur
Ethnic groups in Myanmar
Ethnic groups in Northeast India
Ethnic groups in Manipur
People from Ukhrul district
Ethnic groups in South Asia